The Tovarnik massacre was the mass murder of Croat civilians by Serb forces on 22 September 1991 in the village of Tovarnik.

Background
During the September 1991 Yugoslav Campaign in Croatia, JNA and local Krajina Serb forces attacked and occupied several villages in Eastern Slavonia and Croatian Syrmia (modern-day Vukovar-Srijem County) during the JNA-led offensive against Vukovar and adjacent areas. The village of Tovarnik, on the border with Serbia, fell on the 22 September 1991, after light resistance by a few local Croat defenders.

Killings
JNA and local Serb rebels entered the village and immediately began to abuse and kill the remaining Croat inhabitants that had not been able to flee, 68 Croat civilians were killed on 22 September 1991. Among those killed included the village priest, Ivan Burik.

In the months following the massacre, the local Croat civilian population that remained continued to be abused and persecuted. Croats were forced to wear white armbands to identify themselves. Civilians from Tovarnik and nearby areas continued to be psychologically and physically tortured, with some 300 civilians and POWs taken to nearby detention camps. Serb forces had expelled 95% of the 2,500 Croat inhabitants by the end of 1991 and had destroyed 75% of the homes and buildings in the village.

See also
List of massacres in the Croatian War of Independence

References

1991 in Croatia
Mass murder in 1991
Massacres in 1991
September 1991 events in Europe
Serbian war crimes in the Croatian War of Independence
Massacres in Croatia
Massacres of Croats
Massacres in the Croatian War of Independence